The 1966–67 season of the European Cup football club tournament was won by Celtic for the first time in the final against Internazionale, who eliminated defending champions Real Madrid in the quarter-finals, making them the first British team in history to win the trophy. The Soviet Union entered its champion for the first time this season.

Preliminary round

|}

First leg

Second leg

CSKA Red Flag won 6–1 on aggregate.

Vorwärts Berlin won 12–1 on aggregate.

Bracket

First round

|}

1 Liverpool beat Petrolul Ploiești 2–0 in a play-off match to reach the second round.
2 Górnik Zabrze beat Vorwärts Berlin 3–1 in a play-off match to reach the second round.

First leg

Second leg

Atlético Madrid won 5–1 on aggregate.

Vojvodina won 1–0 on aggregate.

Nantes won 8–4 on aggregate.

Celtic won 5–0 on aggregate.

Ajax won 4–1 on aggregate.

3–3 on aggregate.

Play-off

Liverpool won 2–0 in a play-off match.

Dukla Prague won 6–0 on aggregate.

Anderlecht won 12–1 on aggregate.

Internazionale won 1–0 on aggregate.

Vasas won 7–0 on aggregate.

1860 Munich won 10–1 on aggregate.

Linfield won 9–4 on aggregate.

CSKA Red Flag won 3–2 on aggregate.

3–3 on aggregate.

Górnik Zabrze won 3–1 in a play-off match.

Second round

|}

1 Vojvodina beat Atlético Madrid 3–2 in a play-off match to reach the quarter-finals.

First leg

Second leg

3–3 on aggregate.

Play-off

Vojvodina won 3–2 in a play-off match.

Celtic won 6–2 on aggregate.

Ajax won 7–3 on aggregate.

Dukla Prague won 6–2 on aggregate.

Internazionale won 4–1 on aggregate.

Real Madrid won 3–2 on aggregate.

Linfield won 5–2 on aggregate.

CSKA Red Flag won 4–3 on aggregate.

Quarter-finals

|}

First leg

Second leg

Celtic won 2–1 on aggregate.

Dukla Prague won 3–2 on aggregate.

Internazionale won 3–0 on aggregate.

CSKA Red Flag won 3–2 on aggregate.

Semi-finals

|}

1Internazionale beat CSKA Red Flag 1–0 in a play-off match to reach the final.

First leg

Second leg

Celtic won 3–1 on aggregate.

2–2 on aggregate.

Play-off

Final

Top scorers
The top scorers from the 1966–67 European Cup (excluding preliminary round) are as follows:

References

External links
1966–67 All matches – season at UEFA website
European Cup results at Rec.Sport.Soccer Statistics Foundation
All scorers 1966–67 European Cup (excluding preliminary round) according to protocols UEFA
1966-67 European Cup - results and line-ups (archive)

 
1966–67 in European football
European Champion Clubs' Cup seasons